Sadegh Beit Sayah (born 17 December 1986) is an Iranian Paralympic athlete. He won the silver medal in the men's javelin throw F41 event at the 2020 Summer Paralympics held in Tokyo, Japan.

References

External links 
 

Living people
1986 births
Iranian male javelin throwers
Athletes (track and field) at the 2020 Summer Paralympics
Medalists at the 2020 Summer Paralympics
Paralympic silver medalists for Iran
Paralympic athletes of Iran
Paralympic medalists in athletics (track and field)
People from Ahvaz
Sportspeople from Khuzestan province
21st-century Iranian people